The meaning of life pertains to the significance of living or existence in general.

Meaning of Life or The Meaning of Life may also refer to:

Film and television
Monty Python's The Meaning of Life, a 1983 film
Monty Python's The Meaning of Life (album) (1983)
Monty Python's The Meaning of Life (book) (1983)
Monty Python's The Meaning of Life (video game) (1997)
The Meaning of Life (2005 film), an animated short film by Don Hertzfeldt
The Meaning of Life (TV series), an Irish TV series presented by Gay Byrne

Literature
The Meaning of Life and Other Essays, a 1990 book by Alfred Ayer
Meanings of Life, a 1991 book by Roy Baumeister
The Meaning of Life, a 2007 book by Terry Eagleton
The Meaning of Life, a 2001 book by Bradley Trevor Greive
The Meaning of Life: Buddhist Perspectives on Cause and Effect, a book by Tenzin Gyatso, 14th Dalai Lama
The Meaning of Life: As Shown in the Process of Evolution, a 1928 book by C. E. M. Joad
Meaning in Life, a three-volume book by Irving Singer
Man's Search for Meaning', a 1946 book by Viktor Frankl

Music
Meaning of Life (album), a 2017 album by Kelly ClarksonThe Meaning of Life, an album by Tankard (1990), or its title track

Songs
"Meaning of Life" (Kelly Clarkson song)
"The Meaning of Life" (The Offspring song) (1997)
"Meaning of Life", a 2000 song by Disturbed from The SicknessSee alsoThe Meaning of Liff'', a 1983 humorous dictionary by Douglas Adams and John Lloyd
M.O.L. (video), a 2002 video album by rock band Disturbed
Meaning (disambiguation)